Katja is a feminine given name. In Germany, the Netherlands, Flanders, and Scandinavia, it is a pet form of Katherine. Katja may refer to:

Music 

Katja Andy (1906–2013), German-American pianist
Katja Ebstein (born 1945), German singer
Katja Glieson, Australian recording artist
Katja Schuurman (born 1975), Dutch actress, singer and television personality

Modelling 

Katja Shchekina (born 1986), Russian supermodel

Politics 

 Katja Adler (born 1974), German politician
 Katja Boh (1929–2008), Slovenian sociologist, diplomat, politician
 Katja Kipping (born 1978), German politician, chairwoman of the Left Party
 Katja Husen (1976–2022), German politician
 Katja Suding (born 1975), German politician

Sports 

Katja Demut (born 1983), German triple jumper
Katja Dieckow (born 1984), German diver
Katja Ebbinghaus (born 1948), German tennis player
Katja Gerber (born 1975), German judoka
Katja Haller (born 1981), Italian professional biathlete
Katja Keller (born 1980), German heptathlete
Katja Koren (born 1975), former Slovenian alpine skier
Katja Kraus (born 1970), German footballer
Katja Langkeit (born 1983), German team handball player
Katja Lehto, Finnish female ice hockey player
Katja Mayer (born 1968), German triathlete
Katja Nass (born 1968), German fencer
Katja Nyberg (born 1979), (naturalized) Norwegian team handball player
Katja Požun (born 1993), Slovenian ski jumper
Katja Rajaniemi, Finnish ski-orienteering competitor
Katja Riipi, Finnish female ice hockey player
Katja Roose (born 1981), Dutch female professional kite surfer
Katja Schroffenegger, Italian football goalkeeper
Katja Schülke (born 1984), German team handball player
Katja Seizinger (born 1972), German alpine skier
Katja Tengel (born 1981), German sprinter
Katja Trödthandl, Austrian football midfielder
Katja Višnar (born 1984), Slovenian cross-country skier
Katja Ziliox (born 1970), German swimmer

Other fields 

Katja Fennel, marine biologist
Katja Flint (born 1959), German actress
Katja Herbers (born 1980), Dutch actress
Katja Kallio (born 1968), Finnish novelist, journalist, columnist and screenwriter
Katja Lange-Müller (born 1951), German writer
Katja Medbøe (1945–1996), Norwegian actress
Katja Mragowska (born 1975), Polish-German artist
Katja Pettersson, Swedish designer
Katja Rahlwes (born 1967), German fashion photographer
Katja Riemann (born 1963), German actress
Katja Schuurman (born 1975), Dutch television personality
Katja Špur (1908–1991), Slovene journalist, writer, poet, translator
Katja Suding (born 1975), German politician
Katja Thater (born 1966), German poker player
Katja Tukiainen (born 1969), Finnish artist
Katja von Garnier (born 1966), German film director
Katja Woywood (born 1971), German actress, former child star
Katja Zoch (born 1961), American voice actress

Fictional 

Katja Brandner, fictional character on German soap opera Verbotene Liebe
Northern Crown Katja, fictional fighter in Saint Seiya: Saintia Shō spinoff

See also 
1113 Katja, main belt asteroid
Katia
Katya

References

Feminine given names
German feminine given names
Scandinavian feminine given names
Dutch feminine given names
Finnish feminine given names
Norwegian feminine given names
Danish feminine given names
Swedish feminine given names